Arman means "wish", "hope" in Persian, "God's man" in Armenian, "will," "purpose," "honorable and good man" in Turkish, "man in the army" in Germanic and "ever lasting fire" in Kurdish. Notable people with the name include:

Given name
Arman (artist) (1928–2005), French artist
Arman (actor)  (1921–1980), Iranian-Armenian actor, film director, and producer
Arman Adikyan (b. 1984), Armenian Greco-Roman wrestler
Arman Alizad (b. 1971), Iranian-Finnish master tailor, fashion columnist, and TV personality
Arman Arian (b. 1981), Iranian writer
Arman Dunayev, Kazakhstani politician
Arman Chilmanov (b. 1984), Kazakhstani taekwondo athlete
Arman Geghamyan (b. 1981), Armenian Greco-Roman wrestler
Arman Ghasemi (b. 1989), Iranian association football player
Arman Hall (b. 1994), American sprinter
Arman Hossain (b. 1983), Bangladeshi cricketer
Arman İnci (b. 1991), Turkish-German actor
Arman Kamyshev (b. 1991), Kazakhstani road race cyclist
Arman Karamyan (b. 1979), Armenian-Romanian associated football player
Arman Kirakossian (b. 1956), Armenian diplomat and historian
Arman Loni (1983–2019), Pashtun human rights activist
Arman Manaryan (1929–2016), Iranian-born Armenian film director
Arman Manukyan (1931–2012), Turkish professor, writer, and economist
Arman Mehaković (b. 1988), Bosnian association football player
Arman Manookian (1904–1931), Armenian-American painter
Arman Parvez Murad, Bangladeshi actor
Arman Pashikian (b. 1987), Armenian chess player
Arman Ramezani, Iranian association football player
Arman Sabir, investigative Pakistani journalist
Arman Sadeghi (b. 1977), American entrepreneur
Arman Sedghi (b. 1964), Iranian engineer and assistant professor
Arman Serebrakian (b. 1987), Armenian alpine skier
Arman Shahdadnejad (b. 1989), Iranian association football player
Arman Smailov (b. 1981), Kazakhstani rally driver
Arman Yeremyan (b. 1986), Armenian taekwondo athlete
Arman Zangeneh (b. 1993), Iranian basketball player
Arman Zhetpisbayev (b. 1971), Kazakhstani politician
Arman-Marshall Silla (b. 1994), Belarusian taekwondo athlete

Surname
Abukar Arman, Somali political analyst, writer, and diplomat
Ali Arman (b. 1983), Bangladeshi cricketer
Ayşe Arman (b. 1969), Turkish journalist
Aytaç Arman (b. 1949), Turkish actor
Birgitta Arman (1921–2007), Swedish actress
Cihat Arman (1915–1994), Turkish association football player
Darius Van Arman, American businessman
Delbar Jan Arman, Afghani politician
Hiram M. Van Arman (1839–1904), American politician and journalist
Howard Arman (b. 1954), English choral conductor and opera director
Lucien Arman (1811–1873), French naval architect and politician
Sebastiano Arman (b. 1997), Italian curler
Seyhan Arman (b. 1980), Turkish transgender rights activist, actress, and drag queen
Yasir Arman (b. 1961), Sudanese politician

See also
Armand (name)